Ambrose 'Rosie' O'Donovan (born 11 June 1962 in Gneeveguilla, County Kerry) is an Irish former sportsperson.  He played Gaelic football with his local club Gneeveguilla and was a member of the Kerry senior inter-county team from 1984 until 1992.  O'Donovan captained Kerry to the centenary-year All-Ireland title in 1984.

O'Donovan was captain of the Kerry team which won the 1984 'Centenary All-Ireland' All-Ireland Senior Football Championship. O'Donovan was one of the youngest captains of an All Ireland winning side. He played alongside Jack O'Shea at midfield in two more successful campaigns during 1985 and 1986.

During his school years, he won two All-Ireland Vocational Schools medals with Kerry. He also won an All Ireland Minor medal in 1980.

O'Donoovan played club football with Gneeveguilla and won three O'Donoghue Cups in 1979, 1980 and 1983.  He also helped the local club side win the Kerry Club Championship in 1980 beating formidable Kerry clubs such as Austin Stacks and Castleisland Desmonds.

References

 

1962 births
Living people
All-Ireland-winning captains (football)
Gneeveguilla Gaelic footballers
Kerry inter-county Gaelic footballers
Munster inter-provincial Gaelic footballers
Winners of three All-Ireland medals (Gaelic football)
People from Gneeveguilla